Bob Clayton was an Australian rules footballer and administrator for Port Adelaide.

Port Adelaide's entry into the Australian Football League (AFL) is partially due to the efforts of Bob Clayton during his time as General Manager when the club made its first official bid in 1990. He was also Football Manager when the clubs entry into the AFL was later confirmed.

References

Port Adelaide Football Club (SANFL) players
Port Adelaide Football Club players (all competitions)
Australian rules footballers from South Australia
Australian rules football administrators
Possibly living people
Year of birth missing